Pakistan competed at the 2010 Asian Beach Games held in Muscat, Oman from December 8, 2010 to December 16, 2010.

Medalists

Medal tally by sport

Beach Handball

Group B

Knockout map

Semifinals

Gold place match

Beach Kabaddi

Group B

Knockout stage

Bodybuilding

60 kg
December 10

Pre-Judging

70 kg
December 10

Pre-Judging

Final

Nations at the 2010 Asian Beach Games
2010
Asian Beach Games